William John Molloy, Baron Molloy (26 October 1918 – 26 May 2001) was a British Labour Party politician.

Early life
Molloy was born in Swansea in 1918, and educated at St Thomas Primary School and University College, Swansea.

Career
In World War II, Molloy served in the Royal Engineers and in 1945 joined the Foreign Office, where he became a senior staff representative on the Whitley Council. He left the civil service to pursue a political career in the Labour Party. He became a councillor in Fulham in 1954, before becoming selected as parliamentary candidate for Ealing North in 1962.

He was elected as Member of Parliament for Ealing North from 1964 until the 1979 general election, when he lost the seat to the Conservative Harry Greenway.  Molloy was also a Member of the European Parliament from 1976 to 1977, supporting the "Get Britain Out" (of the European Economic Community) campaign.  
After the loss of his seat in 1979, he was created a life peer on 12 May 1981, taking the title Baron Molloy, of Ealing in Greater London.

Baron Molloy was a member of the Sylvan Debating Club.

Personal life
Molloy was married twice: firstly, in 1942, to Eva Lewis: they had a daughter, Marion, who married Laurence Motl (1927-2019) of St Paul, Minnesota. After Eva's death, Molloy married Doris Paines in 1981 (div.1987).

References 

 Times Guide to the House of Commons 1979

External links 
 

1918 births
2001 deaths
Labour Party (UK) life peers
Labour Party (UK) MPs for English constituencies
UK MPs 1964–1966
UK MPs 1966–1970
UK MPs 1970–1974
UK MPs 1974
UK MPs 1974–1979
Labour Party (UK) MEPs
MEPs for the United Kingdom 1973–1979
Life peers created by Elizabeth II